Colorado   is a 1940 American Western film directed by Joseph Kane and starring Roy Rogers.

Plot
During the American Civil War a Confederate officer who is also a Captain in the Union Cavalry is keeping Federal troops in the Colorado Territory from reinforcing their armies in the East by forming an alliance of secessionists, outlaws, and opportunists as well as arming hostile Indians. Unable to send more reinforcements, the United States Secret Service sends one man, Military intelligence officer Lieutenant Jerry Burke to identify who is behind the troubles and put an end to it. Armed with a sweeping letter of both law enforcement and military powers signed by President Abraham Lincoln Jerry meets his old comrade in arms Gabby to go west.

The Confederate/Union officer calling himself Donald Mason is actually Jerry's brother Donald. Donald escapes arrest but confronts his alliance that they are getting rich whilst he is doing all the work and facing all the danger. Donald takes over by shooting a corrupt Indian Affairs commissioner after informing him that the agent is no longer an asset but a liability.

Donald saves his brother's life and is repaid by Jerry by allowing him to face his end by ley de  fuga instead of hanging after Jerry captures him.

Cast
Roy Rogers as Lieutenant Jerry Burke
George "Gabby" Hayes as "Gabby" Whittaker
Pauline Moore as Lylah Sanford
Milburn Stone as Don Burke alias Captain Donald Mason
Maude Eburne as Etta Mae
Arthur Loft as Jim Macklin – Indian Commissioner
Hal Taliaferro as Weaver
Vester Pegg as Henchman Sam Smith
Fred Burns as Sheriff Jeff Harkins
Lloyd Ingraham as Henry Sanford
Iron Eyes Cody as Indian Henchman 
Spade Cooley as Henchman  
Joseph Crehan as General Ulysses S. Grant

Soundtrack
Roy Rogers - "Night on the Prairie" (Written by Nathan Gluck and Ann Parentean)
Played offscreen by a piano in a saloon - "Ring, Ring de Banjo!" (Written by Stephen Foster)
Played offscreen by a piano in a saloon - "Gwine to Rune All Night" (De Camptown Races) (Written by Stephen Foster)
Played offscreen by a piano in a saloon - "Oh! Susanna" (Written by Stephen Foster)
Played offscreen by a bugler - "Taps" (Written by Daniel Butterfield)
Played on piano by an unidentified man in a Durango bar - "Cielito Lindo" (Traditional Mexican Ballad)

External links

1940 films
1940 Western (genre) films
American Civil War films
American Western (genre) films
Films directed by Joseph Kane
Republic Pictures films
Films set in Colorado
American black-and-white films
1940s English-language films
1940s American films